La Alameda de Gardón is a village and municipality in the province of Salamanca, western Spain, part of the autonomous community of Castile-Leon. It has a population of 83 people.

Geography 

References

Municipalities in the Province of Salamanca